Dimitrios Kasotakis (born 21 September 1996) is a Greek professional footballer who plays as a goalkeeper for Super League 2 club Ierapetra.

References

1996 births
Living people
Greek footballers
Super League Greece players
Football League (Greece) players
Gamma Ethniki players
Platanias F.C. players
Kalamata F.C. players
Association football goalkeepers
People from Agios Nikolaos, Crete
Footballers from Crete